The 2013–14 ISAF Sailing World Cup was a series of sailing regattas staged during 2013–14 season. The series featured boats which feature at the Olympics and Paralympics.

Regattas

Results

2.4 Metre

Men's 470

Women's 470

Men's 49er

Women's 49erFX

Men's Finn

Men's Formula Kite

Women's Formula Kite

Men's Laser

Women's Laser Radial

Mixed Nacra 17

Men's RS:X

Women's RS:X

SKUD 18

Sonar

References

External links
 Official website

2013-14
2013 in sailing
2014 in sailing